Goniobranchus preciosus is a species of colourful sea slug, a dorid nudibranch, a marine gastropod mollusc in the family Chromodorididae.

Distribution
The type locality for this species is Ceylon (Sri Lanka). It has been reported widely in the Indo-West Pacific region.

Description
Goniobranchus preciosus has a white mantle with three lines of colour at the edge. The mantle rim is marked by a thin white line, with a dark red band inside this and then a yellow band. The rhinophore clubs are brown with white edges to the lamellae and the gill leaves are also brown with white markings. The body length varies between 15 mm and 30 mm. This species is very similar to Goniobranchus verrieri and most easily distinguished by the white margin to the mantle. Goniobranchus trimarginatus is also similar, but has white gills and rhinophores and red speckles in the middle of the back.

References

External links
 

Chromodorididae
Gastropods described in 1858